José de la Cruz Porfirio Genaro Díaz Raigosa (29 April 1907 – 1988) was a Mexican bobsledder. He competed in the five-man event at the 1928 Winter Olympics. He is a relative of Mexican president Porfirio Díaz and the brother of bobsledder Genaro Díaz.

Notes

References

External links 
 

1907 births
1988 deaths
Mexican male bobsledders
Olympic bobsledders of Mexico
Bobsledders at the 1928 Winter Olympics
Sportspeople from Mexico City